Dan Alberto Fellus (born 17 December 1987) is a Norwegian-Israeli football striker.

Biography
Dan Alberto Fellus was born in Israel, where his family lived until he was three years old.

Sports career
In 2006, Fellus made his professional debut coming off the bench for Vålerenga in a cup match and even got onto the score sheet within his twenty-one minutes on the pitch. After the 2006 season, Fellus travelled to Israel where he had an unsuccessful trial at Maccabi Tel Aviv. He also played at Hakoah Ramat Gan before he signed for the Norwegian Second Division team Gjøvik-Lyn. His club debut on 3 March 2007 saw Fellus get onto the scoresheet in a 2–1 win over Brumunddal. When league play started, he was the only one to get on the club's scoresheet in a 7–1 loss to Fredrikstad 2.

Later in 2007 he was picked up by Norwegian Premier Division outfit Lillestrøm SK. He did not play often and was loaned out to Bærum SK in 2009. In 2010, he returned to his original club Bøler IF. In mid-2012 he went up the league tier again as he signed for First Division team Strømmen IF. In 2014, he went to third-tier Lørenskog IF.

National team
Fellus has played one match with the Israel U19 team in a friendly against the Northern Ireland U19s at Windsor Park in Belfast on 24 April 2006.

References

1987 births
Living people
Norwegian Jews
Israeli Jews
Footballers from Oslo
Israeli emigrants to Norway
Jewish footballers
Norwegian footballers
Vålerenga Fotball players
Hakoah Maccabi Amidar Ramat Gan F.C. players
Lillestrøm SK players
Bærum SK players
Strømmen IF players
Israeli Premier League players
Norwegian First Division players
Association football forwards
SK Gjøvik-Lyn players
Israel youth international footballers